The Tso Kar or Tsho kar is a fluctuating salt lake known for its size and depth situated in the Rupshu Plateau and valley in the southern part of Ladakh in India. It is also recognised as India's 42nd Ramsar site.

Geography and climate

The Tso Kar is connected by an inlet stream at its south-west end to a small lake, Startsapuk Tso, and together they form the 9 km2 More plains pool, which is dominated by the peaks of two mountains, Thugje (6050 m) and Gursan (6370 m). From the geology of the More Plains, it can be concluded that the Tso Kar in historical times ranged up to this high valley. Until a few years ago the lake was an important source of salt, which the Changpa nomads used to export to Tibet. The nomadic settlement of Thugje is located 3 km in the north. There is a tented camp on the west bank of the lake which provides accommodation for tourists.

Due to the high altitude, the climate is extreme in the winter; temperatures below -40 °C (-40 °F) are not uncommon. In the summer the temperature rises above 30 °C (86 °F), with extreme fluctuations during the day. Precipitation in the form of either rain or snow is extremely rare.

Flora and fauna

The inlets of the Tso Kar are a source of non-saline water; pondweeds and basic nettles grow there, forming floating islands of vegetation in the spring and dying off in the winter. Sedge and large numbers of buttercups grow on the shores of Startsapuk Tso and of the tributaries of the Tso Kar, while some parts of the high basin are marked by steppe vegetation interspersed with tragacanth and pea bushes. The shore of Tso Kar is partly covered with a salt crust, which keeps vegetation away from the inflows.

Due to the salinity of the Tso Kar, most of the resident fauna is found in its tributaries and in Startsapuk Tso. There are large breeding colonies of grebes and brown-headed gulls, and some bar-headed geese, ruddy shelducks and terns. In the vicinity of the lake black-necked cranes and Tibetan grouse are relatively common.
The basin of the Tso Kar and the adjoining More Plains constitute one of the most important habitats of the kiang, Tibetan gazelles, Tibetan wolves and foxes; there are himalayan marmots in the higher reaches. Yaks and horses are kept by nomads.

Currently the lake basin has no special protection, but there are plans to include it within a national park which may be established in the highlands of south-eastern Ladakh.

Access
The Tso Kar lies 160 km south of Leh; the Leh Manali road passes 30 km west of it. The lake is 540 km east of Srinagar, the capital of Jammu and Kashmir union territory.

Accessed from two different routes: Through Leh-Manali route or Pangong Lake route. You can get neighborhood taxis from Leh to reach Tso Kar Lake through the Changtang locale covering absolute distance of 250 kilometers from Leh.

See also 
 Soda lake

References

External links
 Site of the Tourism information of the State of Jammu and Kashmir

Literature
 Kashmir Ladakh Manali – The Essential Guide Partha S. Banerjee, Kolkata: Milestone Books 2010, 

Lakes of Ladakh
Geography of Ladakh
Saline lakes of Asia
Ramsar sites in India